The 1891 College Football All-America team is composed of college football players who were selected by Caspar Whitney as the best players at their positions for the 1891 college football season.  Whitney began publishing his All-America Team in 1889, and 1891 was the first year Whitney's list was published in Harper's Weekly.

All-American selections for 1891

Key
CW = Caspar Whitney, published in Harper's Weekly magazine.
 Bold = Consensus All-American

Ends
Frank Hinkey, Yale (College Football Hall of Fame) (CW)
John A. Hartwell, Yale (CW)

Tackles
Wallace Winter, Yale (CW)
Marshall Newell, Harvard (College Football Hall of Fame) (CW)

Guards
Pudge Heffelfinger, Yale (College Football Hall of Fame) (CW)
Jesse Riggs, Princeton (CW)

Center
John Adams, Penn (CW)

Quarterback
Philip King, Princeton (College Football Hall of Fame) (CW)

Halfbacks
Everett J. Lake, Harvard (later Governor of Connecticut) (CW)
Lee McClung, Yale (College Football Hall of Fame) (CW)

Fullback
Sheppard Homans, Jr., Princeton (CW)

Notes

All-America Team
College Football All-America Teams